John "Snooks" Kelley (July 11, 1907 – April 10, 1986) was an American ice hockey coach. Kelley was coach of the Boston College Eagles ice hockey team for 36 years. Kelley won the 1949 NCAA ice hockey title and was the first coach to win 500 games in the NCAA. He was inducted into the United States Hockey Hall of Fame in 1974

Career 
Kelley arrived at Boston College in 1925 after attending Boston College High School. He was a two sport athlete for the Eagles, playing both baseball and ice hockey.  Kelley finished his collegiate playing career following his graduation in 1930. Kelley's graduation came just after hockey was removed from as a varsity sport due to the Great Depression.

On January 8, 1933, Kelley agreed to coach a group of BC students while he was completing his teaching at Cambridge Latin. The position offered no pay, and forced him to give up playing with the Boston Hockey Club, but it was the beginning of a career that would last until 1972.  Kelley's coaching career was put on hold with the outbreak of World War II. In 1942 Kelley joined the United States Navy and remained enlisted until 1946, before returning to coaching.

Just three years after serving with the Navy Kelley lead his Boston College team over Dartmouth and win the NCAA national championship. It would be the first championship won by an Eastern school.  The 1949 National Championship was the only one of his career, however he would lead the Eagles back to the title game in 1965. Boston College lost the championship game to Michigan Tech 8–2.

On December 26, 1952 Boston’s famous Beanpot Tournament was established. Kelley enjoyed great success in the tournament winning 5 of the first 10. Some have pointed to his success in the Beanpot leading to Kelley gaining his stature as the face of BC hockey. Kelley coached BC to eight Beanpot titles in thirteen years, including three in a row from 1963-65.

In addition to the National Championship and his Beanpot wins Kelley also racked up an impressive amount of accolades including: eight New England Championships, nine appearances in the ECAC Division I playoffs, one ECAC playoff title and nine NCAA Tournament appearances. Kelley won the Spencer Penrose Award as College Hockey's Coach of the Year in 1959 and 1972. His success at BC earned him the nickname "Dean of American College Hockey Coaches".

In a February 23, 1972 game against rival Boston University Kelley earned his 500th win making him the first NCAA Division-I men's hockey coach to reach that mark. For his career Kelley posted a record of 501-243-15 in his 36-year career.  His 501 wins would remain a school record until current coach Jerry York, who played for Kelley from 1963 to 1967, passed him in 2014. Kelley had spent most 41 of the first 47 years of his adult life on the Heights as either a player or coach.

In 1970 Kelley was inducted into the Boston College Varsity Club Athletic Hall of Fame. Two years later, in 1972, Kelley received the Lester Patrick Trophy for his contribution to hockey in the United States, not only for his accomplishments on the ice but also because he steadfastly refused to recruit players from Canada. Kelley felt recruiting Canadians would deprive Americans of a chance to develop their hockey potential. In 1974 Kelley be inducted in the United States Hockey Hall of Fame.

On April 10, 1986, following a long bout with an illness, John "Snooks" Kelley died. He was 78 years old.

Head coaching record

Source:

See also
List of college men's ice hockey coaches with 400 wins

References

External links

1907 births
1986 deaths
American ice hockey coaches
Boston College Eagles baseball players
Boston College Eagles men's ice hockey players
Boston College Eagles men's ice hockey coaches
Lester Patrick Trophy recipients
Sportspeople from Cambridge, Massachusetts
United States Hockey Hall of Fame inductees
United States Navy sailors
Boston College High School alumni